In Some Way, Shape, or Form is the fifth studio album by American rock band Four Year Strong, released through Decaydance and Universal Republic on November 8, 2011.

Recording and composition
On April 4, it was announced that keyboardist Josh Lyford had left the group. The album was recorded between June–August 2011  at House of Loud Recording Studios in Elmwood Park, New Jersey. David Bendeth produced all of the tracks except for "Fairweather Fan" and "Bring on the World"; recording was handled by Dan Korneff, Kato Khandwala, and John Bender. "Fairweather Fan" and "Bring on the World" were produced and engineered by Shep Goodman and Aaron Accetta. Chris Fasulo and Jon D'Uva did additional engineering with assistance from Brian Robbins and Jon Lammi. Bendeth mixed the recordings with Korneff as engineer, before they were mastered by Ted Jensen at Sterling Sound. The album was influenced by Alexisonfire's Crisis (2006).

Release
In August 2011, the group performed at the Hevy and Sonisphere festivals in the UK. On August 18, the band released the song "Stuck in the Middle" for free listening as a free taster from the album, with an unofficial music video following on October 19, which showed footage of the band  on their latest tour and features scenes of the recording process of In Some Way, Shape, or Form. On September 8, 2011, the band released another song for free, "Falling on You", which was already played live on the band's latest tour. On September 11, In Some Way, Shape, or Form was announced for release in November. Alongside it, the album's artwork was revealed. "Just Drive" was released to radio on September 27. On October 14, Alternative Press revealed the track list of the album.

On October 26, the band released another song for free listening. The song, entitled "Fairweather Fan", is a special song the band dedicated to their fans and was previously leaked in low quality footage that was filmed during the band's Fall 2011 AP Tour, where they debuted the song. The band released the song as a free download on their Facebook page. A music video was released for "Just Drive" on October 27. On November 4, the band uploaded the whole album for free streaming on their Facebook page. In October and November, the band headlined the AP Fall Tour with support from Gallows, Title Fight, the Swellers and Sharks.

In December, the band went on a brief holiday tour dubbed It's a Wonderful Gig Life, with support from Set Your Goals, Balance and Composure, Transit, and Diamond. In January 2012, the group went on a tour of Brazil with New Found Glory, leading up to a UK tour that ran into February, with support from Don Broco and A Loss for Words. Though This Time Next Year was intended to also join the tour, they had to pull out due to financial issues. In June, the group appeared at Download Festival, and supported Blink-182 for a handful of shows on their UK tour. Alongside this, they played a one-off headlining show.

Reception

The album sold over 6,500 copies in its first week, debuting at number 88 on the Billboard 200, nearly half of what their previous album Enemy of the World sold in its first week.

Track listing
All songs written by Four Year Strong, except where noted.

AP Fall Tour 7" ("Falling on You" single)

Song titles
"The Security of the Familiar, the Tranquility of Repetition" is a line from the film V for Vendetta.
"Only the Meek Get Pinched, the Bold Survive" is a line from the film Ferris Bueller's Day Off.
"Fight The Future" is titled in reference to the first X-Files film, of which "Fight the Future" was the subtitle and tagline. The X-Files is also heavily referenced in the music video for the album's first single "Just Drive", including a street sign that reads "The truth is out there," one of the mottos of the series.
When a tentative track listing was released, "Bring on the World" was shown to be titled "This Is Your Life and It's Ending One Minute at a Time", a line from the film Fight Club.

Personnel
Personnel per booklet.

Four Year Strong
 Alan Day – lead vocals, guitar, additional piano
 Dan O'Connor – lead vocals, guitar
 Joe Weiss – bass guitar, additional vocals (tracks 3 and 12)
 Jake Massucco – drums

Production
 David Bendeth – producer (all except tracks 5 and 10), mixing
 Dan Korneff – recording, mix engineer
 Kato Khandwala – recording
 John Bender – recording
 Shep Goodman – producer (tracks 5 and 10), engineer (tracks 5 and 10)
 Aaron Accetta  – producer (tracks 5 and 10), engineer (tracks 5 and 10)
 Chris Fasulo – additional engineering
 Jon D'Uva – additional engineering
 Brian Robbins – assistant engineer
 Michael "Mitch" Milan – guitar technician
 Jon Lammi – assistant engineer
 Ted Jensen – mastering

Design
 Joe Spix – art direction, design
 F. Scott Schafer – photography
 Bryn Bowen – props
 Four Year Strong – props

References
 Citations

Sources

External links

In Some Way, Shape, or Form at YouTube (streamed copy where licensed)

2011 albums
Four Year Strong albums
Decaydance Records albums
Universal Motown Records albums
Albums produced by David Bendeth